Krithyam is a 2005 Indian Malayalam-language film directed by Viji Thampi and starring Prithviraj Sukumaran as both the protagonist and antagonist.

Plot
Sandra Punnoose discovers that she has six months to live. She hires a hitman Christy Lopez to end her life, posing as her caretaker Solomon. Christy tries to kill her, but Sandra escapes. But her driver is shot.

The case is handled by police officer Surya Narayanan. On questioning Sandra, he learns about Christy and tries to catch him. One day Sandra meets Sathya who saves her from a robbery in a shopping mall. Sandra mistakes him to be Christy and hands him over to the police. The police try to make him admit the truth, but he doesn't say a word. Later his friend Badsha and his guardian, a priest comes to bail him out and tells everyone that he Sathya, a dumb boy, who is an orphan, brought up by the father. Sandra feels sorry for Sathya and to make up for it befriends him. Sathya who is already smitten by Sandra is as happy as he can be. Soon their friendship changes into love.

Meanwhile, Christy repeatedly attempts to kill Sandra, but always fails. His failures make Christy obsessed with killing her.

Later Sandra learns from her friend Lavanya's brother Ramdas Menon a doctor in US her condition is curable. She prepares to leave for the US for treatment. Once back, she confesses her love to Sathya and both decide to get married. On the day of the marriage, however, Christy faints Sathya and takes his place as the groom. He, on the pretext of driving to church, leaves with Sandra in the car. Meanwhile, Sathya regains consciousness and tries to call Sandra from the landline. Sandra receives the call and when receiving only some sounds (like the ones dumb people make) realizes that it is Sathya on the line and that it is Christy who is with her in the car. She pretends to be talking to her friend and tricks Christy into disclosing where he is taking her.
He takes her to a nearby island, where he is going to kill her. Sandra reveals that it was her who gave the quotation, but that doesn't stop Christy from wanting to kill her. Sathya arrives there and a fight ensures between them. Christy overpowers Sathya and is about to kill him when Surya Narayanan arrives and shoots Christy, who falls into the sea. The movie ends with the couple leaving along with the police and Christy, who is not dead, resurfacing from the water.

Cast
Prithviraj Sukumaran  as Sathya and Christy Lopez
Parul Yadav as Sandra Punnoose
Indrajith as Dr.Ramdas Menon
Eva Pavithran as Lavanya
Shruthy Menon as Julia
Siddique as ACP Surya Narayanan IPS
Jagathy Sreekumar aa Solomon Joseph
Kalpana as Victoria
Salim Kumar as Badsha
Tony as Jacob Punnoose
P. Sreekumar as Joseph Punnoose
Viji Thampi as Lawrence

References

External links
 

2000s Malayalam-language films
2000s crime action films
Indian crime action films
2005 films
Films directed by Viji Thampi
Films scored by M. Jayachandran